Ricardo Favela (January 13, 1944 – July 15, 2007) was an American artist, professor, and civil rights activist based in Sacramento, California. He was a founding member of the Chicano art collective group Royal Chicano Air Force.

Life and career
Favela was born in Kingsburg, California. He attended Sacramento State University where he received his B.A. in 1971 and M.A. in 1989. Favela began teaching art classes at Sacramento State University in the 1980s and eventually became a full-time professor in  the Art Department in 1997.

Favela worked in screen printing and ceramic sculptures. His artworks are in the collections of the Smithsonian American Art Museum and the University Galleries of Sacramento State University.

Death
Favela died of a heart attack on July 15, 2007, in Visalia, California.

Legacy
Ricardo Favela Park in the McKinley Village neighborhood of Sacramento, California.

References

External links
Guide to the Ricardo Favela papers CEMA 72, UC Santa Barbara Library, Department of Special Research Collections.

Ricardo Favela at the Smithsonian American Art Museum

American artists of Mexican descent
California State University, Sacramento alumni
California State University, Sacramento faculty
1944 births
2007 deaths